Walsa Rural LLG is a local-level government (LLG) of Sandaun Province, Papua New Guinea. Waris languages are spoken in this LLG.

Wards
01. Doandai (Auwe-Daonda language speakers)
02. Smock (Auwe-Daonda language speakers)
03. Namola
04. Daunchendi
05. Epmi
06. Doponendi (Waris language speakers)
07. Wainda
08. Holosa
09. Daundi
10. Tamina 1
11. Fas 1 (Fas language speakers)
12. Waina (Sowanda language speakers: Waina dialect/village)
13. Punda (Sowanda language speakers: Punda and Umeda dialects/villages)

References

Local-level governments of Sandaun Province